The 2017–18 Columbia Lions women's basketball team represented Columbia University during the 2017–18 NCAA Division I women's basketball season. The Lions, led by second-year head coach Megan Griffith, played their home games at Levien Gymnasium and were members of the Ivy League. They finished the season 8–21, 2–12 in Ivy League play to finish in last place. They failed to qualify for the Ivy women's tournament.

Previous season
They finished the season 13–14, 3–11 in Ivy League play to finish in a tie for seventh place.

Roster

Schedule

|-
!colspan=9 style=| Non-conference regular season

|-
!colspan=9 style=| Ivy League regular season

See also
 2017–18 Columbia Lions men's basketball team

References

Columbia Lions women's basketball seasons
Columbia
Columbia
Columbia